Stenorhopalus flavicans is a species of beetle in the family Cerambycidae. It was described by Fairmaire & Germain in 1859.

References

Beetles described in 1859
Necydalinae